Line S1 of the Wenzhou Rail Transit is a suburban rapid transit line in Wenzhou running from  to . The west section was opened on January 23, 2019. The east section of the line ( with 6 stations) was opened on September 28, 2019.

Opening timeline

Stations

Gallery

Notes

References

01
Railway lines opened in 2019
Airport rail links in China